Never Lose Sight is the eleventh studio album from contemporary Christian music artist Chris Tomlin. It was released on October 21, 2016 through sixstepsrecords.

Commercial performance 
Never Lose Sight debuted at No. 6 on the US Billboard 200 with 32,000 units, 30,000 of which were pure album sales. It also debuted at No. 1 on the Christian Albums chart.

Track listing

Personnel 

 Chris Tomlin – lead vocals, acoustic guitar (11)
 Ross Copperman – keyboards (1, 13), programming (1, 13), acoustic guitar (1), backing vocals (1)
 Matt Gilder – keyboards (1, 13, 14), acoustic piano (2, 6, 8-12), organ (9)
 Ed Cash – acoustic piano (2), keyboards (2, 6, 7), programming (2, 3, 6, 7, 9, 14), acoustic guitars (2, 3, 4, 9, 14), electric guitars (2, 3, 4, 9, 14), backing vocals (2-7, 9-12, 14)
 Jeremy Edwardson – keyboards (2, 5, 6, 7, 10, 11, 12), programming (2, 5, 6, 7, 10, 11, 12), electric guitar (7, 10), acoustic guitar (12), additional keyboards (13), additional programming (13)
 Andrew Jackson – keyboards (2, 5, 6, 7, 10, 11, 12), programming (2, 5, 6, 7, 10, 11, 12), additional keyboards (13), additional programming (13)
 Martin Cash – programming (3, 14), additional backing vocals (9)
 Matt Maher – acoustic piano (5), acoustic guitar (5), lead and harmony vocals (14)
 Ian McIntosh – keyboards (5, 7), programming (5, 7), additional keyboards (10)
 Jason Ingram – keyboards (14), lead and harmony vocals (14)
 Pat Barrett – acoustic guitar (1)
 Daniel Carson – electric guitars (1, 2, 4, 6, 7, 10-14), acoustic guitar (2, 9, 11)
 Danny Rader – electric guitar (1, 13), acoustic guitar (13), bouzouki (13)
 Tore Kulleseid – electric guitar (2, 5, 6, 7, 9, 10-13), acoustic guitar (6, 7, 9, 10, 12)
 Chris Lacorte – electric guitars (3, 14)
 Jonathan Berlin – electric guitar (8, 12), additional backing vocals (8)
 Andy Gullahorn – acoustic guitar (8), backing vocals (8)
 Matthew Melton – bass (1, 2, 4, 6, 8-14)
 Daniel James Mackenzie – bass (5, 7)
 Fred Eltringham – drums (1)
 Travis Nunn – drums (2, 4, 6, 10, 12, 13), percussion (2, 6, 8, 10), cajón (8)
 David Whitworth – drums (5, 7), percussion (5, 7)
 Jacob Schrodt – drums (9)
 Lewis Patzner – cello (2, 5, 6)
 Claire Nunn – cello (8)
 Anton Patzner – viola (2, 5, 6), violin (2, 5, 6)
 Danny Gokey – lead and harmony vocals (3)
 Gabe Kossol – backing vocals (5, 6, 7, 12)
 Jill Phillips – backing vocals (8)
 Franni Cash – additional backing vocals (9)
 Nickie Conley – additional backing vocals (9)
 Jason Eskridge – additional backing vocals (9)
 Chris McClarney – additional backing vocals (9)
 Kim Walker-Smith – lead and harmony vocals (11)
 Micah Wilshire – backing vocals (13)
 Scott Cash – backing vocals (14)
 Matt Redman – lead and harmony vocals (14)

Production 

 Brad O'Donnell – A&R 
 Ross Copperman – producer (1, 13)
 Ed Cash – producer (2, 3, 4, 9, 14), additional engineer (2), engineer (3, 4, 9, 14), mixing (3), vocal producer (5, 6, 7, 10, 11, 12)
 Jeremy Edwardson – producer (2, 5-13), additional engineer (2, 6, 8, 10-13), engineer (5, 7, 9), vocal recording (Kim Walker-Smith on 11)
 Joe Baldridge – engineer (1, 2, 6, 8-13)
 Josh Ditty – assistant engineer (1, 2, 6, 8-13)
 Andrew Jackson – additional engineer (2, 6, 8, 10-13), engineer (5, 9), assistant engineer (7)
 Maestro Lightford – vocal recording (Danny Gokey on 3)
 Justin Niebank – mixing (1)
 Mark Endert – mixing (2, 5)
 Robert Orton – mixing (4)
 Christopher Stevens – mixing (6)
 Sam "Mix" Gibson – mixing (7, 8, 10, 11, 12)
 Sean Moffitt – mixing (9, 13, 14)
 Drew Bollman – mix assistant (1)
 Doug Johnson – mix assistant (2, 5)
 Brian David Willis – digital editing (1)
 Stephen Marcussen – mastering 
 Scott Johnson – production assistant (1)
 Becca Wildsmith – art direction, design 
 Cameron Powell – photography 
 Marz – grooming 
 Kim Rosen Perrett – styling

Studios
 Recorded at Ocean Way, The Red Room and Blackbird Studios, Nashville, Tennessee; Ed's, Franklin, Tennessee; The Soundhouse, Redding, California
 Mixed at Blackbird Studios and Yods's Place, Nashville, Tennessee; Hounds Ear Studio, Leiper's Fork, Tennessee; Ed's and fabmusic, Franklin, Tennessee; Indian River Studios, Merritt Island, Florida; Cardiff Creative Lab, Cardiff, Wales, UK
 Mastered at Marcussen Mastering, Hollywood, California

Charts

Certifications

Awards and nominations

GMA Dove Awards

References 

Chris Tomlin albums
2016 albums
Albums produced by Ed Cash
Albums produced by Ross Copperman